The 56th edition of the Vuelta a España (Tour of Spain), a long-distance stage race and one of the three Grand Tours, was held from 8 September to 30 September 2001.

Additionally, Guido Trenti became the first American ever to win a stage in the race.

Teams 

A total of 21 teams were invited to participate in the 2001 Vuelta a España. Fifteen of the competing squads were UCI Division I teams, while the other six teams were UCI Division II. Mercury–Viatel, who were previously scheduled to ride, didn't start. Each team sent a squad of nine riders, so the Vuelta began with a peloton of 189 cyclists, a total of 139 riders made it to the finish in Madrid.

The 21 teams invited to the race were:

Stages

Jersey progress

Final standings

General classification

Points classification

Mountains classification

Sprints classification

Team classification

References

External links
La Vuelta (Official site in Spanish, English, and French)
Cyclingnews.com 2001 Vuelta a Espana coverage

 
2001 in road cycling
2001
2001 in Spanish sport